Kosta Manev (born 7 April 1993) is a Macedonian professional footballer who plays as a defender.

Career
Manev has played for Klubi-04, PK-35 Vantaa, Viikingit, Honka, Inter Turku and PS Kemi.

After spending his entire senior career in Finland, Manev returned to Macedonia in summer 2018 and signed a one-year contract with FK Vardar. 

On 27 July 2019, he signed a one-year contract with Premier League of Bosnia and Herzegovina club FK Velež Mostar. Manev made his official debut for Velež on 10 August 2019, in a 0–0 away league draw against FK Sloboda Tuzla. He left Velež after his contract with the club expired in June 2020.

Personal life
Originally from Radoviš, Manev moved to Finland in 2009. He has also acquired a Finnish citizenship.

References

1993 births
Living people
People from Radoviš
Finnish people of Macedonian descent
Association football defenders
Finnish footballers
Macedonian footballers
Klubi 04 players
PK-35 Vantaa (men) players
FC Viikingit players
FC Honka players
FC Inter Turku players
Kemi City F.C. players
Kakkonen players
Ykkönen players
Veikkausliiga players
FK Vardar players
Macedonian First Football League players
FK Velež Mostar players
Premier League of Bosnia and Herzegovina players
Macedonian expatriate footballers
Expatriate footballers in Bosnia and Herzegovina
Macedonian expatriate sportspeople in Bosnia and Herzegovina
Macedonian expatriate sportspeople in Finland
Naturalized citizens of Finland